This is a list of notable alumni who attended Brisbane Boys' College. Alumni of Brisbane Boys' College are known as Old Collegians and may elect to join the school's alumni association, the BBC Old Collegians' Association.

Academic
George G. Watson - Cambridge don

Business
David Lenigas – Chief Executive Officer of Lonrho Africa Limited

Defence
Galfry Gatacre  (1907–1983), Royal Australian Navy rear admiral and first-class cricketer
Squadron Leader Beaufort Mosman Hunter Palmer  – pilot, war hero, farmer

Media and arts
 Charles Cottier – actor
 Rex Cramphorn – theatre director, costume designer, critic and translator
 Lachlan Gillespie – member of The Wiggles
 Darren Middleton - musician - former member of Powderfinger
 Woo Kyungjun (우경준) - K-pop Idol - Member of TNX

Medicine and health sciences
 Franklin White –  President of Canadian Public Health Association (1986–88); Medal of Honor (1997) Pan-American Health Organization; endowed chair at Dalhousie University (1982–89) and Aga Khan University 1998–2003

Rhodes Scholars
Hugh Dunn (1949)
John Wylie (1983)
Robert Mullins (2008)

Sport

Australian rules football
Clint Bizzell – Geelong Football Club and Melbourne Demons
Courtenay Dempsey – Essendon Bombers
Chris Scott – Brisbane Lions
Hamish Simpson – Geelong Cats

Cricket
Chris Hartley – Queensland Bulls
Craig Philipson – Queensland Bulls

Rowing
Haimish Karrasch Olympic Games 1996 and 2000, https://en.wikipedia.org/wiki/Haimish_Karrasch

Rugby league
Dane Gagai – Brisbane Broncos and Newcastle Knights

Rugby union
Tom Banks - Queensland Reds, ACT Brumbies, Wallabies
Angus Cottrell – Melbourne Rebels flanker
Hugh Dunn - Uncapped Queensland, Rugby Half Blue and Blue - University of Queensland, Australian Universities
Will Genia – Queensland Reds and the Wallabies (Vice Captain); now plays for Melbourne Rebels
Roger Gould – Queensland Reds and the Wallabies
Ben Gunter – Plays for the Panasonic Wild Knights (Japan) and has also represented the Japanese Brave Blossoms
James Horwill – Queensland Reds and the Wallabies; former Qld Reds and Australian Wallabies Captain; Harlequins
John Roe – Queensland Reds and the Wallabies; former Qld Reds Captain

Football
Zachary Anderson – Central Coast Mariners
Ross Archibald – Melbourne Heart

Snow Skiing

Pieter Hawkins  Australian Aerials Freestyle Skier

Swimming
Kieren Perkins  – Olympic gold medallist

Track & field
Matthew McEwen Decathlete, silver medalist, Manchester Commonwealth Games 2002
Mitchell Watt long jumper, silver medalist, London Summer Olympics 2012
Ashley Moloney-Decathlete

See also
Old boy network

References

Lists of Australian men
Lists of people educated in Queensland by school affiliation
Brisbane Boys